Pohjola is a Finnish surname. Notable people with the surname include:

 Jukka Pohjola (1878–1948), Finnish politician
 Pekka Pohjola (1952–2008), composer and producer
 Kaija Pohjola (born 1951), singer
 Matti Pohjola, economist
 Ilmari Pohjola, trombonist, see Ultra Bra
 Mika Pohjola (born 1971), musician
 Mike Pohjola (born 1978), game designer

Finnish-language surnames